General elections were held in Liechtenstein in March and April 1894.

Electors 
Electors were selected through elections that were held between 4 and 9 May. Each municipality had two electors for every 100 inhabitants.

Results 
The election of Oberland's Landtag members and substitutes was held on 16 May in Vaduz. Of Oberland's 118 electors, 114 were present. Oberland elected seven Landtag members and three substitutes.

The election of Unterland's Landtag members and substitutes was held on 17 May in Mauren. Of Unterland's 74 electors, 73 were present. Unterland elected five Landtag members and two substitutes.

References 

Liechtenstein
1894 in Liechtenstein
Elections in Liechtenstein
May 1894 events